Taddea Malaspina (1505 - 1559) was an Italian marchesa. She was the mistress of Alessandro de' Medici, Duke of Florence from the early 1530s to about 1537 and was likely the mother of at least two of his children, Giulio di Alessandro de' Medici and Giulia de' Medici. Giulio de' Medici was associated with the Malaspina family at different points throughout his life.

Early life 
Taddea was born as the younger daughter of Alberico Malaspina, sovereign Marquis of Massa, and his wife, Lucrezia d'Este. She married Count Giambattista Boiardo di Scandiano. After his death and the death of her father, Malaspina lived with her mother in Florence and had a number of lovers, including Alessandro. Her sister Ricciarda inherited the title after their father's death. Through Ricciarda's marriage, the family was related to Pope Innocent VIII. Ricciarda was probably also one of Alessandro de' Medici's lovers.

Biography 
In a portrait of Alessandro by Pontormo, dated to about 1534, the Duke, dressed in black, draws the profile of a woman in silverpoint. The portrait may have been a gift for Malaspina. The Chiesa della Madonna del Carmine and the Santa Chiara monastic complex in Massa, now in the Italian province of Massa Carrara, were built on Taddea Malaspina's order; they still stand.

See also
Ricciarda Malaspina, Taddea's sister

Notes

References
Langdon, Gabrielle (2006). Medici Women: Portraits of Power, Love, and Betrayal. University of Toronto Press. 
Levy, Allison (2006). Re-Membering Masculinity in Early Modern Florence. Ashgate Publishing Ltd. 

1505 births
Year of death missing
Nobility from Florence
Mistresses of Italian royalty
Taddea
16th-century people of the Republic of Florence